Warden Head Light, also known as Ulladulla Lighthouse, is an active lighthouse on Warden Head, a headland south of Ulladulla, New South Wales, Australia, guarding the entrance to the Port of Ulladulla. It is one of only two wrought iron lighthouses in New South Wales, the other being its sibling, Wollongong Breakwater Lighthouse. It is also notable for two relocations: the tower was constructed in 1873 on the Ulladulla Breakwater, and relocated in 1889 to its current location. Its keeper's house was relocated to a different location in the 1920s.

History

First recommendations for construction of a lighthouse at the Ulladulla Harbour were made in 1868, enabling night activity at the port. Construction of a lighthouse at the Ulladulla Harbour breakwater was initiated by Edward Orpen Moriarty MA MInstCE, Engineer in Chief of the New South Wales Harbours and Rivers Department, together with a second lighthouse at Belmore Basin, Wollongong. Both lighthouses were designed by Colonial Architect's Office, then under Colonial Architect James Barnet. Tenders were invited in October 1869 by the Public Works Department, and both lighthouses were constructed by Joseph Mather, Wollongong Breakwater Lighthouse in 1872 and Warden Head Lighthouse in 1873.

The original light source was oil wick with a light intensity of 800 cd, with a Chance Brothers optical apparatus, which is still present. It displayed a fixed white light (F.W.).

In 1889 the lighthouse was relocated to its current location on Warden Head, under the supervision of James Barnet, still the Colonial Architect.

In 1920 the light source was replaced with a carbide lamp, automated and demanned. The characteristic was changed to a flashing one. In 1922, the keeper's house, no longer required, was relocated to Milton to be used as a doctor's office.

In 1964 the tower was electrified. The current power source is a 110 V DC battery, charged from the mains electricity. The current light source is a 120 V, 1,000 W, quartz halogen lamp with an intensity of 28,000 cd, visible for  The current light characteristic is a group of two flashes every 10 seconds (Fl.(2)W. 10s).

In the 1940s a car park was developed at Warden Head by the Ulladulla Council to encourage visitors to the lighthouse.

In 2008 the lighthouse was renovated. The lead based paint was stripped, the tower was repainted, and structural repairs were made.

Light keepers
The first Lighthouse keeper was William Gambell. Records of the Ulladulla public school show he had five children at the school.

Records of the Milton Post Office of 1904 list "Hansen J. Lighthouse keeper (Ulladulla)". The Ulladulla Post Office directory of 1904 lists "Brassington A,  - lighthouse keeper".

Structure
The tower is made of riveted wrought iron plates forming the shell. The plates which were created Joseph Mather's foundry at Wollongong and assembled on the original site on the Ulladulla Breakwater. The structure is divided by three timber floors, connected by iron ladders.

On top of the wrought iron shell is a small balcony supported by cast iron brackets, with a plain iron handrail.

Warden Head
Warden Head is named after shipwrights brothers David and James Warden. It was previously called Long Nose Point.

Site operation and visiting
The light and the tower are operated by Transport for NSW. The grounds are accessible by road and parking is available, but the tower itself is closed to the public.

See also

 List of lighthouses in Australia

Notes

References

 
 
 

 
 
 
 
 

Lighthouses completed in 1873
Lighthouses in New South Wales
1873 establishments in Australia
Relocated buildings and structures in Australia